The Invierno 2008–09 season started on July 27 with 2 groups of 6 teams, they will play twice (home and away) with the teams of their own group (10 games) and once with the teams of the other group (6 games), for a total of 16 games. The 3 top teams of each group qualify for the playoffs. The winners of group A and B get a bye week, while the 2nd of group A plays the 3rd of group B and the 2nd of group B plays the 3rd of group A. The winners of these series move to the semi-final series.

The home field advantage in the playoffs is given to the team with the best record in the group stage.

The winner of the playoff series will gain entry into the group stage of the 2009–10 CONCACAF Champions League. The runner-up will gain entry into the 2009-10 CONCACAF Champions League preliminary round. If the same team wins both the Invierno and Verano tournaments then the preliminary round spot will be awarded to the team with the next best regular season record in the Verano tournament.

Invierno 2008

Group stage

Playoffs

Verano 2009

Group stage

Playoffs

Aggregate Table 

 Saprissa earned CRC1 spot in 2009–10 CONCACAF Champions League.
 Liberia Mía earned CRC2 spot in 2009–10 CONCACAF Champions League.
 Herediano earned CRC3 spot in 2009–10 CONCACAF Champions League (berth reallocated from Nicaragua).

Top goalscorers

References

External links 
 Official League Standings

Liga FPD seasons
1
Costa